Daniel Sørvik (born 11 March 1990) is a Norwegian ice hockey player who is plays for HC Verva Litvínov of the Czech Extraliga.

Sørvik competed in the 2013 and 2014 IIHF World Championship, and the 2014 Winter Olympics, as a member of the Norway men's national ice hockey team.

Career statistics

Regular season and playoffs

International

External links

1990 births
Living people
Norwegian ice hockey defencemen
Ice hockey people from Oslo
Olympic ice hockey players of Norway
Ice hockey players at the 2014 Winter Olympics
Ice hockey players at the 2018 Winter Olympics
Furuset Ishockey players
GCK Lions players
Vålerenga Ishockey players